The 2014 Colonial Square Ladies Classic was held from November 7 to 10 at the Nutana Curling Club in Saskatoon, Saskatchewan as part of the 2014–15 World Curling Tour. This was the third Grand Slam event on the women's World Curling Tour. The event was held in a triple-knockout format, and the purse was CAD$47,000, of which the winner, Eve Muirhead, received CAD$12,000. In the final, Muirhead defeated Sherry Middaugh of Ontario, scoring a game-winning deuce in the last end to make the final score 5–4.

Teams
The teams are listed as follows:

Knockout Draw Brackets
The draw is listed as follows:

A Event

B Event

C Event

Playoffs

Quarterfinals
Monday, November 10, 9:00 am

Semifinals
Monday, November 10, 12:00 pm

Final
Monday, November 10, 3:00 pm

References

External links

Colonial Square Ladies Classic
Colonial Square Ladies Classic
Colonial Square Ladies Classic
Curling in Saskatoon
Colonial Square Ladies Classic